The 2023 Turismo Carretera is the 81st season of Turismo Carretera, the premier stock car category of Argentina.

Calendar

Teams and drivers

Results and standings

Results summary

Championship standings
Points system

Drivers' Championship standings

References

External links
Series website

Turismo Carretera
Turismo Carretera
Turismo Carretera